Pajamäki is a neighborhood of Helsinki, Finland. It is located in Pitäjänmäki district.

, Pajamäki has 1,802 inhabitants living in an area of 0.27 km2.

References 

Pitäjänmäki